Division No. 18, Saskatchewan, Canada, is one of the eighteen Statistics Canada census divisions within the province, occupying the northern half of the province. The census division is coextensive with the Northern Saskatchewan Administration District (NSAD).

The most populous communities in the census division are La Ronge and La Loche with populations of 2,743 and 2,611 respectively.

Demographics 

Census subdivisions 
Division No. 18 has 58 census subdivisions, of which 24 are municipalities (including a portion of the City of Flin Flon, a city bisected by the Saskatchewan-Manitoba border, 2 northern towns, 11 northern villages and 10 northern hamlets), 32 are First Nations communities (31 Indian reserves and an Indian settlement), an unincorporated northern settlement and the unorganized balance of Division No. 18. All municipalities within the census division, except for the Northern Hamlet of Black Point, are recognized as census subdivisions.

Cities

Northern towns

Northern villages

Northern hamlets

Indian settlements

Indian reserves

Unincorporated communities 
A northern settlement is an unincorporated community in the Northern Saskatchewan Administration District, and its administration is regulated by The Northern Municipalities Act. Saskatchewan has 11 northern settlements. One northern settlement, Missinipe, is recognized as a census subdivision by Statistics Canada.

See also 

 List of census divisions of Saskatchewan
 List of communities in Saskatchewan

References

 
18